The Online Abuse Prevention Initiative (OAPI) is a non-profit organization whose aim is to study and combat abuse on the Internet.

History 

The OAPI was founded in 2015 by Randi Lee Harper, with Crash Override Network's  Zoë Quinn and Alex Lifschitz stated as serving on the inaugural board of directors. In March 2015 Quinn announced a formal partnership between the two organizations.

Activities 

The stated goals of the OAPI are to study online abuse, and to reduce and mitigate it through technical measures and collaboration with tech companies.  Its first public campaign was an open letter to ICANN, the organization responsible for coordinating the Internet's Domain Name System, opposing the latter's plans to end anonymity of WHOIS records for commercial websites.  OAPI argues that ICANN's proposals will make it easier for abusers to physically endanger domain name registrants through doxxing and swatting, and that those marginalized for their race, gender, or sexual orientation are disproportionately at risk. The letter attracted signatures and support from over fifty organizations supporting online privacy or protection of at-risk communities, including the Electronic Frontier Foundation, The Tor Project, and the National Coalition Against Domestic Violence.

References

External links 
 
 

Cyberbullying
Gamergate (harassment campaign)
Internet culture
Organizations established in 2015
Video game culture